Only Deaf is Real is a live album by thrash metal band Toxic Holocaust. The release of this album was limited to 500 copies.

Track listing

References

Toxic Holocaust albums
2007 live albums

Live thrash metal albums